The Civil Aeronautics Board (CAB) was an agency of the federal government of the United States, formed in 1938 and abolished in 1985, that regulated aviation services including scheduled passenger airline service and provided air accident investigation. The agency headquarters were in Washington, D.C.

Functions
The primary role of the CAB was to regulate scheduled commercial airline operations in the United States. The CAB strictly controlled all U.S. certificated airlines ("scheduled carriers") -- deciding which routes would be serviced by which airlines, and setting minimum limits on passenger fares (comparable to the Interstate Commerce Commission) -- effectively managing competition between airlines, and ensuring certain levels of service to communities throughout the United States.

While the CAB regulation suppressed free competition, it provided security for the existing airlines, avoided gluts and shortages of passengers on certain routes, and (partly by allowing airlines to carry air mail) secured airline service for communities that would have otherwise been served less, or not have been served at all (due to low passenger traffic or other reasons).

To achieve its goals, the CAB was empowered to provide and administer subsidies to airlines. Further, the CAB regulated airline industry mergers and intercompany contracting -- but shielded the airlines from antitrust regulation. Additionally, within the airline industry, the CAB was assigned to prevent deceptive trade practices and unfair competition methods (similar to the role of the Federal Trade Commission).

History

The Civil Aeronautics Authority Act of 1938 superseded the Watres Act, which had regulated commercial aviation since the mid-1920s, and created a new agency, the Civil Aeronautics Authority. The agency was renamed in 1940, due to a  merger with the Air Safety Board. It became an independent agency under Reorganization Plans Nos. III and IV of 1940, effective on June 30, 1940. The Air Safety Board had formed in 1938.

Other predecessor agencies included the Aeronautics Branch (1926–1934), the Bureau of Air Commerce (1934–1938), and the Bureau of Air Mail, Interstate Commerce Commission (1934–38).

The first air accident investigation led by the CAB was the 1940 Lovettsville air disaster.

Some duties were transferred to the Federal Aviation Agency in 1958.

The National Transportation Safety Board (NTSB) was established in 1967, taking over air accident investigation duties.

In the late 1970s, during the administration of President Jimmy Carter, and under the guidance of his economic advisor Alfred Kahn (who had specialized in research on deregulation, and was appointed CAB Chairman), the CAB became the target of the early deregulation movement, and its dissolution was one of the most conspicuous pioneering events of the movement. The Airline Deregulation Act of 1978 specified that the CAB would eventually be disestablished — the first federal regulatory regime, since the 1930s, to be totally dismantled — and this happened on January 1, 1985. The remaining tasks were transferred to the Secretary of Transportation except for a few going to the U.S. Postal Service.

Offices

The agency had its headquarters in the Universal Building in Dupont Circle, Washington, D.C. The agency had moved there by May 1959. Previously it had been headquartered in the Commerce Building (a.k.a. the Herbert C. Hoover Building), and its offices were in several buildings. After moving into the Universal Building, CAB leased space there.

See also
 United States government role in civil aviation

References

Further reading
 Kahn, Alfred E. (last CAB Chairman), Alfred E. Kahn, Airline Deregulation, in The Concise Encyclopedia of Economics by libertarian website "Library of Economics & Liberty" of the Liberty Fund

External links

 Records of the Civil Aeronautics Board - United States National Archives
 Oversight of Civil Aeronautics Board practices and procedures : hearings before the Subcommittee on Administrative Practice and Procedure of the Committee on the Judiciary, United States Senate, Ninety-fourth Congress, 1975
Volume 1: Testimonies. ; 
Volume 2: Testimonies. ; 
Volume 3: Testimonies. ; 
Appendix Volume 1: Part 1: Questionnaires. ; 
Appendix Volume 2: Part 2: Questionnaires, Responses. ; 
Appendix Volume 3: Part 2: Responses. ; 
Appendix Volume 4: Part 3: CAB Materials. 
Appendix Volume 5: Part 4: CAB Materials. 

 National Transportation Library - Includes air accident reports and other materials from the CAB, Air Safety Board, and Bureau of Air Commerce, dating to 1934
 Investigations of Aircraft Accidents 1934-1965

Government agencies established in 1938
1938 establishments in the United States
1985 disestablishments in the United States
United States
Aviation organizations based in the United States
Aviation authorities
Organizations based in Washington, D.C.
Defunct independent agencies of the United States government
Transportation government agencies of the United States